Eryxia is a genus of leaf beetles in the subfamily Eumolpinae. It is distributed in Africa and Western Asia.

Species
Subgenus Eryxia Baly, 1865:
 Eryxia annobioides Escalera, 1914
 Eryxia baikiei Baly, 1865
 Eryxia confusa Selman, 1972
 Eryxia dentipes Pic, 1940
 Eryxia gracilipes Lefèvre, 1890
 Eryxia holosericea (Klug, 1835)
 Eryxia lineaticollis Pic, 1938
 Eryxia major Burgeon, 1941
 Eryxia ritchiei Bryant, 1933
 Eryxia subtessellata Pic, 1938
Subgenus Azerberyxia Romantsov & Moseyko, 2020
 Eryxia serratotibialis Romantsov & Moseyko, 2020

Species moved to Colasposoma:
 Eryxia coracina Lopatin, 1996
 Eryxia grandis Lefèvre, 1890
 Eryxia socotrana Gahan, 1903

Species moved to Melindea:
 Eryxia virescens Lefèvre, 1885

References

Eumolpinae
Chrysomelidae genera
Taxa named by Joseph Sugar Baly
Beetles of Africa
Beetles of Asia